Sympleurotis armatus is a species of beetle in the family Cerambycidae. It was described by Gahan in 1892. It is known from Mexico and Panama.

References

Colobotheini
Beetles described in 1892